Guadalupe Catholic School (GCS) is the only parochial school in Makati, Philippines.  It is located at 1923 Orense St., Guadalupe Nuevo, Makati, Metro Manila, Philippines next to the National Shrine of Our Lady of Guadalupe. It is the only Parochial School in Makati.

External links

Roman Catholic Archdiocese of Manila Educational System
Catholic elementary schools in Metro Manila
Catholic secondary schools in Metro Manila
Schools in Makati